This list of related male and female reproductive organs shows how the male and female reproductive organs and the development of the reproductive system are related, sharing a common developmental path. This makes them biological homologues. These organs differentiate into the respective sex organs in males and females.

List

Internal organs

External organs
The external genitalia of both males and females have similar origins. They arise from the genital tubercle that forms anterior to the cloacal folds (proliferating mesenchymal cells around the cloacal membrane). The caudal aspect of the cloacal folds further subdivides into the posterior anal folds and the anterior urethral folds. Bilateral to the urethral fold, genital swellings (tubercles) become prominent. These structures are the future scrotal swellings and labia majora in males and females, respectively.

The genital tubercles of an eight-week-old embryo of either sex are identical. They both have a glans area, which will go on to form the glans clitoridis (females) or glans penis (males), a urogenital fold and groove, and an anal tubercle. At around ten weeks, the external genitalia are still similar. At the base of the glans, there is a groove known as the coronal sulcus or corona glandis. It is the site of attachment of the future prepuce. Just anterior to the anal tubercle, the caudal end of the left and right urethral folds fuse to form the urethral raphe. The lateral part of the genital tubercle (called the lateral tubercle) grows longitudinally and is about the same length in either sex.

Human physiology
The male external genitalia include the penis, the male urethra, and the scrotum. The female external genitalia include the clitoris, the labia majora, and the labia minora, which are collectively called the vulva. External genitalia vary widely in external appearance among different people.

One difference between the glans penis and the glans clitoridis is that the glans clitoridis packs nerve endings into a volume only about one-tenth the size of the glans penis. Therefore, the glans clitoridis has greater variability in cutaneous corpuscular receptor density (1-14 per 100× high-powered field) compared with the glans penis (1-3 per 100× high-power field). Touch for touch, this concentration of nerves makes the glans clitoris more sensitive than the glans penis. As a result, many women can feel discomfort or pain with anything more than a gentle touch.

References

Embryology of urogenital system
Human reproductive system
Reproductive organs